Vyas (Byas), is a municipality of Tanahun District located in Gandaki Province in Nepal and incorporates the village Damauli, the district headquarters, for which the municipality is also often referred to as Damauli. The municipality was established by merging the former Village development committee Damauli with several of its neighbors, the most recent merger being the one with Pokhari Bhanjyang in 2014. It lies on the bank of Madi Khola.

It is one of the municipalities, which could be formed after the re-establishment of multiparty democracy in 1991 A.D. At the time of the 2011 Nepal census, it had a population of 70,335 people living in 18,339 individual households.

It is believed that Sage Vyasadeva (different from the current Vyasa known as Krishna Dwaipayana Vyasa) was born in the vicinity of Vyas, for which the municipality was named after him.

Demographics
At the time of the 2011 Nepal census, Vyas Municipality had a population of 71,051. Of these, 64.7% spoke Nepali, 14.7% Magar, 6.6% Gurung, 4.7% Newar, 4.6% Darai, 1.0% Urdu, 0.8% Bote, 0.6% Bhojpuri, 0.5% Tamang, 0.4% Dura, 0.3% Maithili, 0.2% Chepang, 0.2% Hindi, 0.1% Bhujel, 0.1% Kumhali, 0.1% Rai, 0.1% Tharu and 0.1% other languages as their first language.

In terms of ethnicity/caste, 20.1% were Magar, 15.4% Hill Brahmin, 13.1% Chhetri, 8.5% Gurung, 8.1% Newar, 7.9% Kami, 4.9% Darai, 4.2% Sarki, 3.7% Damai/Dholi, 2.2% Gharti/Bhujel, 2.0% Kumal, 1.9% Musalman, 1.9% Thakuri, 1.2% Bote, 1.1% Dura, 1.0% Sanyasi/Dasnami, 0.7% Tamang, 0.3% Chepang/Praja, 0.3% Rai, 0.2% Badi, 0.2% other Dalit, 0.1% Kathabaniyan, 0.1% Teli, 0.1% Tharu, 0.1% Yadav and 0.2% others.

In terms of religion, 88.8% were Hindu, 6.0% Buddhist, 2.1% Christian, 1.8% Muslim, 0.5% Prakriti, 0.4% Bon and 0.4% others.

In terms of literacy, 79.9% could read and write, 2.0% could only read and 18.0% could neither read nor write.

Ward Profile 
There are 14 wards in Vyas Municipality:

Media 
To promote local culture Vyas has four FM radio stations. That are Radio Bhanubhakta, Damauli F.M, Smart F.M, and Madi Seti FM, all of which are community radio stations.

Transportation 
Vyas lies on Prithvi Rajmarg, a highway from Kathmandu to Pokhara.

References

External links
UN map of the municipalities of Tanahu District

Populated places in Tanahun District
Municipalities in Gandaki Province
Nepal municipalities established in 1992